This is a list of city and town halls in the United States.

Alabama

Former 

 Mobile City Hall

Arizona 

 Phoenix City Hall

Arkansas 

 Little Rock City Hall

California 

 Bakersfield City Hall
 Beverly Hills City Hall
 Burbank City Hall
 Chula Vista City Hall
 Fresno City Hall
 Hayward City Hall
 Los Angeles City Hall
 Oakland City Hall
 Pasadena City Hall
 Sacramento City Hall
 San Francisco City Hall
 San José City Hall
 Thousand Oaks City Hall
 West Hollywood City Hall

Colorado 

 Ouray City Hall and Walsh Library

Connecticut 
 Knowlton Memorial Hall (Ashford)
 Branford Town Hall
 Bridgeport City Hall
 Deep River Town Hall
 Enfield Town Meetinghouse
 Greenwich Town Hall
 Hartford Municipal Building
 New Haven City Hall and County Courthouse
 Norwalk City Hall
 Old Town Hall (Stamford, Connecticut)
 Waterbury City Hall — part of Waterbury Municipal Center Complex
 Town Hall (Westport, Connecticut) (former; moved municipal offices in 1979)
 Windham Town Hall

District of Columbia

 John A. Wilson Building, current municipal building, also known as the District Building
 District of Columbia City Hall, former municipal building, now serves as a courthouse

Florida

 Coral Gables City Hall
 Holly Hill City Hall
 Kelsey City City Hall
 Miami City Hall
 Orange City Town Hall
 Orlando City Hall
 Pensacola City Hall
 Tampa City Hall
 Jacksonville City Hall
 Windermere Town Hall

Former 

 Belleair Town Hall
 Boca Raton Town Hall
 Chipley City Hall
 Crystal River City Hall
 Fort Pierce City Hall
 Homestead Town Hall
 Lake Wales City Hall
 Lake Worth City Hall Annex
 Live Oak City Hall
 Tarpon Springs City Hall

Georgia

 Atlanta City Hall
 City Hall and Firehouse
 City Hall (Macon, Georgia)
 Griffin City Hall
 Jaeckel Hotel
 Ponce City Market (former)
 Savannah City Hall
 Statesboro City Hall and Fire Station
 Sumner High School and auditorium
 United States Post Office and Customs House (Atlanta) (former)

Hawaii 

 Honolulu Hale

Illinois 

 Chicago City Hall
 Charleston City Hall
 Fairbury City Hall
 Oregon City Hall
 Hillsboro Civic Center
 Peoria City Hall

Indiana 

 City-County Building (Indianapolis)

Former 

 Fort Wayne Old City Hall Building
 Old Indianapolis City Hall

Iowa 

 Davenport City Hall
 Des Moines City Hall
 Ottumwa City Hall

Kentucky 

 Louisville City Hall

Maine 

 Portland City Hall

Maryland 

 Baltimore City Hall
 Cumberland City Hall

Former 

 Cumberland, Maryland City Hall & Academy of Music

Massachusetts 

 Boston City Hall
 Worcester City Hall and Common

Former 

 Boston City Hall

Michigan 

 Coleman A. Young Municipal Center

Former 

 Detroit City Hall

Minnesota 

 Bigfork Village Hall
 Buhl City Hall
 Cloquet City Hall
 Faribault City Hall
 Hastings City Hall
 Henderson Community Building
 Howard Lake City Hall
 Ironton City Hall
 Kimball City Hall
 Lake City City Hall
 Mahnomen City Hall
 Minneapolis City Hall
 Saint Paul City Hall and Ramsey County Courthouse
 Virginia City Hall
 Waverly Village Hall
 Winona City Hall

Former
 Ada Village Hall
 Appleton City Hall
 Delano Village Hall
 Gibbon Village Hall
 Grey Eagle Village Hall
 Kasson Municipal Building
 Milaca Municipal Hall
 Nerstrand City Hall
 Owatonna City and Firemen's Hall
 Wadena Fire and City Hall
 Young America City Hall

Missouri 
 Columbia City Hall
 Kansas City City Hall
 St. Louis City Hall
 University City City Hall

Former 

 California City Hall
 St. Charles City Hall

Nebraska 

 Omaha City Hall

Former 

 Omaha City Hall

Nevada 

 Las Vegas City Hall

New Jersey 

 Edgewater Borough Hall
 Hoboken City Hall
 Metuchen Borough Hall
 Newark City Hall
 Ocean City City Hall
 Paterson City Hall
 Perth Amboy City Hall
 Trenton City Hall

New York 

 Albany City Hall
 Buffalo City Hall
 Cohoes City Hall
 Kingston City Hall
 New York City Hall
Rochester City Hall
 Schenectady City Hall
 Syracuse City Hall
etc

Former 

 Brooklyn City Hall

North Carolina

Former 

 Kinston City Hall
 Wilmington City Hall

Ohio 

 Anna Town Hall
 Athens Governmental Buildings
 Cincinnati City Hall
 College Hill Town Hall
 Franklin Township Hall

Oregon 

 Astoria City Hall
 Portland City Hall
Milwaukie City Hall

Former 
 Astoria City Hall
 Eugene City Hall

Pennsylvania 

 Bradford Old City Hall
 Philadelphia City Hall
 Pittsburgh City Hall

Tennessee 

 Coalmont City Hall

Texas 

 Dallas City Hall
 Houston City Hall

Vermont 

 Montpelier City Hall

Virginia 

 Alexandria City Hall

Former 

 Richmond City Hall

West Virginia 

 Charleston City Hall

Wisconsin 

 Milwaukee City Hall

See also 

 List of city and town halls

 
Hal
Local government-related lists